Kiipsaare Lighthouse is located on the tip of the Harilaid peninsula on the island of Saaremaa, Estonia, in the territory of Vilsandi National Park.

The lighthouse was built from reinforced concrete in 1933. Its purpose was to warn mariners on the Baltic Sea about the dangers in the vicinity of the peninsula and to be of assistance in taking bearings. A lack of supporting ground has caused the lighthouse to lean.

While in 1988 the waterline was still  from the lighthouse, by the early 1990s the sea had already reached the lighthouse and it started to incline. Because of this the generator was removed in 1992 and Kiipsaare Lighthouse remained in the records as a daymark until 2009.

See also 

 List of lighthouses in Estonia

References

External links 
 Estonian lighthouses list Maritime Administration (in Estonian)

Lighthouses in Estonia
Buildings and structures in Saaremaa
Inclined towers
Saaremaa Parish
Tourist attractions in Saare County
Lighthouses completed in 1933